Thyroid hormone receptor beta (TR-beta) also known as nuclear receptor subfamily 1, group A, member 2 (NR1A2), is a nuclear receptor protein that in humans is encoded by the THRB gene.

Function 

The protein encoded by this gene is a nuclear hormone receptor for triiodothyronine. It is one of the several  receptors for thyroid hormone, and has been shown to mediate the biological activities of thyroid hormone. Knockout studies in mice suggest that the different receptors, while having certain extent of redundancy, may mediate different functions of thyroid hormone.  Defects in this gene are known to be a cause of generalized thyroid hormone resistance (GTHR), a syndrome characterized by goiter and high levels of circulating thyroid hormone (T3-T4), with normal or slightly elevated thyroid stimulating hormone (TSH). Several transcript variants have been observed for this gene, but the full-length nature of only one has been observed so far.

Interactions 

Thyroid hormone receptor beta has been shown to interact with:

 BRD8,
 CCND1, 
 NCOA1,
 NCOA6,
 NCOR2, 
 NR2F6,
 PPARGC1A, and
 RXRA.

References

Further reading 

 
 
 
 
 
 
 
 
 
 
 
 
 
 
 
 
 
 

Intracellular receptors
Transcription factors